
Alexander Stockton Cussons (1914–1986). Born in Salford, England to Alexander Tom Cussons (1875–1951) and his wife Emily Jane Cussons (née Kidd, 1875–1957). Alexander was the Chairman of Cussons Group, the largest independent soap manufacturer in Britain. Alexander continued manufacturing of the famous brand Cussons Imperial Leather, and many other products under the Cussons label, including 1001 Carpet Cleaner.

Career
Alexander worked at the Cussons Company from 1931 until his retirement in 1968. Before becoming chairman of the main Cussons Company Alexander was chairman of the South African subsidiary. South Africa was the first overseas market for the Cussons brand. In 1963 Alexander succeeded his brother Leslie to become chairman of the Cussons Company. As chairman Alexander established new factories in Jamaica and Ethiopia.

Alexander continued the manufacture of the flagship brand Cussons Imperial Leather and other Cussons branded products. Alexander also obtained the rights to manufacture and distribute the German brand Badedas in Britain. Badedas is a bath additive containing extract of horse chestnuts. The launch party was held at the Savoy Hotel. The Badedas brand remains popular in Britain today and has since been acquired by Unilever.

In 1968 Alexander suffered a heart attack which he survived. Subsequently he retired as Chairman of Cussons and moved to Durban, South Africa. This marked the end of a line of family chairmen which went back for over sixty years. Alexander chose as his successor Michael Bucks. Michael Bucks was well qualified for the position. He had extensive experience in company finance, having served as a director for the Rothschild family business.

Alexander became a director of several companies following his retirement from Cussons, including the Sylko Paper Company, manufacturing cards, paper and table products.

Conservation Work
Alexander supported conservation efforts and donated land in Shetland, including Ronas Hill (the highest point in Shetland), to become a national nature reserve. Alexander was also a member of the World Wildlife Fund and knew the leading conservationist Sir Peter Scott. Alexander wished to preserve vulnerable and endangered species and considered starting a breeding program in South Africa to help against the threat of extinction.

Cussons Roses
The popular 'Wendy Cussons' Rose was named after Alexander's wife, Wendy. The rose was bred by C. Gregory & Son. Ltd. of Nottingham and released in 1956. The Wendy Cussons rose was globally very successful over many years, winning awards, and is still available in 2021, over 60 years after its introduction. The rose has been depicted on national postage stamps for Hungary, Mongolia and Bhutan. Another rose, Julie Cussons, a salmon coloured floribunda bred by Gareth Fryer of Knutsford, was named after Alexander's grandchild, Julie, who died at the age of two in 1985.

Other interests
Alexander had many interests, one of which was maritime history and he commissioned a collection of ship models by Donald McNarry. McNarry took eight years to build the collection which featured ships that had sailed round the South African Cape. The collection was temporarily exhibited in London in 1968 before moving to South Africa. The collection was put on public display in the Maritime Museum, Cape Town, South Africa, but can now be found in the City Museum, Durban, South Africa.

Alexander had a large collection of Chinese snuff bottles from the Qing dynasty, which were featured in a number of publications.

Alexander was also interested in Roman history, and was involved in campaigning and fundraising for reconstruction efforts on Hadrian's Wall, located at Housesteads. The original plan was to rebuild a 200 yards long section of the wall.

Residence
Alexander whilst Chairman of Cussons resided at Parkdale, Altrincham, Cheshire, now the head office of the Vegetarian Society. Following his retirement from Cussons Alexander moved to Dalcrue Farm, Natal, South Africa.

References

 
 

1914 births
1986 deaths
People from Salford
20th-century English businesspeople
British expatriates in South Africa